Robert Bishop may refer to:

 Robert Hamilton Bishop (1777–1855), Scottish-American educator and Presbyterian minister
 Robert R. Bishop (1834–1910), Massachusetts lawyer and politician
 Bob Bishop, chief scout for Manchester United in Northern Ireland in the 1960s, who is credited with discovering George Best
 Rob Bishop (born 1951), U.S. Representative from Utah
 Bob Bishop (Heroes), fictional character on Heroes whose real name is Robert Bishop
 Rob Bishop (baseball), American baseball coach
 Robert Bishop (artist) (1945–1991), American fetish artist